

James Wilson (20 February 1787 – 17 October 1850) was a journalist and politician who was the paternal grandfather of US president Woodrow Wilson.

Life and career
Born in Ulster, Ireland in 1787, Wilson emigrated in his youth to the United States. He settled in Philadelphia, where he found work as a printer in the office of the Aurora, a Jeffersonian newspaper edited by William Duane. He rose to the position of foreman, publisher, and then editor. Continuing his journalistic career in Steubenville, Ohio, he purchased the Western Herald, which name he changed to Western Herald & Steubenville Gazette. He became involved in state politics, representing Jefferson County in the Ohio House of Representatives in 1816–1817 and 1820–1822. In 1832, he founded the Pennsylvania Advocate, a Pittsburgh newspaper which he owned and edited for a year before turning it over to his oldest son William Duane Wilson. Though not a lawyer, James Wilson served for several years as an associate judge for the Jefferson County common pleas court. Wilson died in Steubenville on 17 October 1850 from an attack of cholera. He was elected to the Ohio Journalism Hall of Fame in 1933.

Family
Wilson married Ann Adams in Philadelphia in 1808. Both were of Scotch-Irish origin. They had seven sons and three daughters. The youngest son, Joseph Ruggles Wilson, born in Steubenville in 1822, was the father of Woodrow Wilson.

References

Bibliography

1787 births
1850 deaths
Journalists from Ohio
Journalists from Pennsylvania
Members of the Ohio House of Representatives
American people of Scotch-Irish descent
Woodrow Wilson family
19th-century American politicians
19th-century American journalists
Deaths from cholera
Infectious disease deaths in Ohio
Irish emigrants to the United States (before 1923)
People from Ulster